Ẓ (minuscule: ẓ) is a letter of the Latin alphabet, formed from Z with the addition of a dot below the letter. It is used in the transcription of Afroasiatic languages, specifically:
as transcription of the Arabic letter Ẓāʼ
in the Berber Latin alphabet to represent // (an emphatic z)

Latin letters with diacritics